Fergus Falls is a city in and the county seat of Otter Tail County, Minnesota, United States. The population was 14,119 at the 2020 census.

History

The falls from which the city gets part of its name were discovered by Joe Whitford (a Scottish trapper) in 1856 and promptly named in honor of his employer, James Fergus. It is not known whether Fergus ever visited the city, but Whitford did not live to see the city develop, as he was killed during the 1862 Dakota war in western Minnesota. In 1867, George B. Wright was at the land office at St. Cloud and found Whitford's lapsed claim, purchased the land, and built what is now the Central Dam in downtown Fergus Falls around 1871. After Wright died in 1882, his son Vernon moved from Boston to Minnesota and took over his father's interests in the town. Vernon Wright was also one of the two people who established the Otter Tail Power Company in 1907. The city was incorporated in the late 1870s and is situated along the dividing line between the former great deciduous forest of the Northwest Territories to the east and the great plains to the west, in a region of gentle hills, where the recent geological history is dominated by the recession of the glaciers from the last great Ice Age, with numerous lakes and small rivers.

Two major tornadoes hit Fergus Falls during the early 20th century, the second, the 1919 Fergus Falls tornado, being the greater. The only church edifice left standing after the great cyclone was the predominantly black Baptist church.

21st century
Fergus Falls features many different parks (tallgrass prairie and eastern woodlands), stores, and other tourist attractions. The Union Avenue Bridge spans the Otter Tail River, and was reconstructed in 2004. Just below the bridge is part of scenic River Walk Park, which spans about a mile of the river. The part nearest the Union Avenue Bridge was redone along with the bridge. The town hall was modeled after Independence Hall in Philadelphia. Its west wing housed the city fire station until the 1970s. Other points of interest include the county museum, Lake Alice, George B. Wright Park, Pebble Lake Golf Course, and Veteran's Memorial Park. Arts in Fergus Falls are booming with a community theater program downtown. Many local and professional artists perform at A Center for the Arts.

The city also lends its name to the song "Fergus Falls" by the band Field Report on its 2012 self-titled album.

Fergus Falls received international coverage in early 2017  and late 2018 after a news article in Der Spiegel falsely claimed there was an anti-Mexican sign at the city's entrance and fabricated other things about the town. The story's author, Claas Relotius, admitted to numerous instances of journalistic fraud. In December 2018 two residents of Fergus Falls, Michele Anderson and Jake Krohn, published a report pointing out the "11 most absurd lies" of the 2017 article. The same month Der Spiegel also sent a reporter to Fergus Falls to investigate and apologize.

Ethnicity
A strong economic division between later Scandinavian immigrant farmers and the earlier English and Scottish war veterans who retained control of the principal businesses of the city center, the banks, and the increasingly important Otter Tail Power Company, persisted for decades until several generations of ethnic intermarriage and continuing inward and outward migration largely erased the divisions along ethnic lines. The small black community, largely Baptist, which clustered in the Southeast section of the city, gradually dwindled as people departed for larger cities.

Growth
The dams built on the Otter Tail River beginning in the 1880s were powerful economic forces that shaped the area's development. Returning soldiers from the American Civil War settled in the region, mostly as farmers (wheat and corn in the western plains and dairy and hogs in the eastern hills and forests). The importance of the Civil War experience to these early settlers is highlighted by the town's street names: the intersecting principal thoroughfares are Lincoln Avenue and Union Avenue. The oldest parts of the town have streets with names such as Sherman, Sheridan, and Vernon. The early English wave of settlement claimed control of the falls along the Otter Tail River and established the first Episcopalian and Presbyterian churches.

Immigration
Almost as soon as the foundational structure of the town was laid, an influx of Norwegian immigrants arrived, by way of the Scandinavian migration of Chicago and Minneapolis, often on the Great Northern Railway. Primarily dairy farmers, they established numerous Lutheran churches in the area. The Lutheran Brethren (Church of the Lutheran Brethren of America) established an academy in Fergus Falls, which today operates a private high school, theological seminary and mission society, with an office in Fergus Falls. The pietistic, low-church Lutherans constituted one cultural center of the Norwegian-German community, while the high-church First Lutheran constituted a separate center, which attracted a more upwardly mobile class of parishioner.

Population growth and loss
After the Interstate Defense Highway System built Interstate 94 along the western edge of Fergus Falls in the late 1950s, population mobility increased dramatically, and high school graduates increasingly left the town to attend colleges in Morris, Fargo-Moorhead, or the Twin Cities of Minneapolis and Saint Paul. As farming declined as an occupation and lifestyle, with large-scale commercial farming gradually replacing the family farm system during the second half of the 20th century, the city appeared increasingly destined to become a retirement and nursing community until a new migration of younger remote workers moved to the city. The bucolic environment, with abundant sporting opportunities that had long attracted summer vacationers, combined with the relatively low cost of real estate and cost of living have brought people wishing to raise their children away from the comparatively commercialized and higher crime environments of larger cities.

Geography

Interstate 94 / U.S. Highway 59/U.S. Highway 52 and Minnesota State Highway 210 (co-signed); and County Highways 1, 82 and 88 are the main routes in Fergus Falls.

Lakes

Major highways
The following routes are located within the city of Fergus Falls.

  Interstate 94
  U.S. Highway 59
  Minnesota State Highway 210
 Otter Tail County Highway 1
 Otter Tail County Highway 82
 Otter Tail County Highway 88

Climate

Demographics

2010 census
As of the census of 2010, there were 13,138 people, 5,814 households, and 3,262 families residing in the city. The racial makeup of the city was 95.5% White, 1.1% African American, 0.8% Native American, 0.7% Asian, 0.4% from other races, and 1.6% from two or more races. Hispanic or Latino of any race were 1.6% of the population.

There were 5,814 households, of which 25.5% had children under the age of 18 living with them, 43.0% were married couples living together, 9.6% had a female householder with no husband present, 3.5% had a male householder with no wife present, and 43.9% were non-families. 38.7% of all households were made up of individuals, and 18.2% had someone living alone who was 65 years of age or older. The average household size was 2.15 and the average family size was 2.84.

The median age in the city was 43.4 years. 21.4% of residents were under the age of 18; 8.4% were between the ages of 18 and 24; 22% were from 25 to 44; 25.9% were from 45 to 64; and 22.2% were 65 years of age or older. The gender makeup of the city was 47.0% male and 53.0% female.

2000 census
As of the census of 2000, there were 13,471 people, 5,633 households, and 3,306 families residing in the city. The racial makeup of the city was 97.02% White, 0.62% African American, 0.76% Native American, 0.57% Asian, 0.01% Pacific Islander, 0.20% from other races, and 0.82% from two or more races. Hispanic or Latino of any race were 0.91% of the population.

There were 5,633 households, out of which 28.1% had children under the age of 18 living with them, 47.2% were married couples living together, 9.0% had a female householder with no husband present, and 41.3% were non-families. 35.5% of all households were made up of individuals, and 18.0% had someone living alone who was 65 years of age or older.  The average household size was 2.25 and the average family size was 2.94.

In the city, the population was spread out, with 23.0% under the age of 18, 10.0% from 18 to 24, 24.5% from 25 to 44, 20.3% from 45 to 64, and 22.1% who were 65 years of age or older.  The median age was 40 years. For every 100 females, there were 89.0 males.  For every 100 females age 18 and over, there were 85.6 males.

The median income for a household in the city was $31,454, and the median income for a family was $44,280. Males had a median income of $32,051 versus $20,841 for females. The per capita income for the city was $18,929.  About 7.0% of families and 10.8% of the population were below the poverty line, including 11.4% of those under age 18 and 10.0% of those age 65 or over.

Economy
Fergus Falls is a micropolitan with a diversified economy that includes healthcare, manufacturing, commercial, agricultural, information technology, and utilities. The largest employer is Lake Region Healthcare, an integrated health system with a 108-bed hospital, cancer research center, assisted living community, and multiple clinics.

Largest employers
According to the Fergus Falls Economic Improvement Commission's 2015 Community Profile  the largest employers in the city are:

Education

Fergus Falls Public Schools (Independent School District #544) operates public schools.
Elementary schools
Adams Elementary (1-2)
Cleveland Elementary (3-4)
McKinley Elementary (K-1)
Prairie Science Class (4-5)
School of Choice, Homeschool Co-op (K-8)
Kennedy Secondary School (5-12), with separate middle and high school divisions, is the sole public secondary school

Private schools:
Claire Ann Shover Nursery School (Pre K)
Trinity Lutheran Elementary (Pre K)
Morning Son Christian School (Pre K-6)
Our Lady of Victory School (K-6)
Hillcrest Lutheran Academy (9-12)

Higher education
Minnesota State Community and Technical College
Lutheran Brethren Seminary
Park Region Luther College (no longer exists)

Arts and culture
Fergus Falls is home to several arts and culture organizations and has a reputation of being a cultural hub in West Central Minnesota.

A Center for the Arts building was originally built in 1921 and was home to The Orpheum Theater, producing live theater and vaudeville performances and movies. In the early 1990s, after several decades of change and transition, over $1 million was raised to renovate the theater and A Center for the Arts was founded. The Theater is also home to one of the largest pipe organs in the midwest, the Mighty Wurlitzer Theater Pipe Organ.

The Kaddatz Galleries is a nonprofit art gallery located in historic downtown Fergus Falls, whose mission is to foster visual arts education and appreciation, and to maintain a gallery where the works of Charles Beck and other recognized local artists are accessible to the public. The Kaddatz Galleries were founded in 2001 when Artspace bought The Kaddatz Hotel building in partnership with the Hotel Kaddatz Preservation Association. The upstairs of the Kaddatz Hotel Building is home to artist live/work spaces.

The Lake Region Arts Council serves 9 counties (Becker, Clay, Otter Tail, Wilkin, Traverse, Stevens, Grant, and Pope) and has its main office in the River Inn Building in Fergus Falls. The Lake Region Arts Council's mission is to encourage and support the arts in West Central Minnesota. Their programs and services are made possible through an appropriation from the Minnesota State Legislature, Legacy Arts & Cultural Heritage Fund and the McKnight Foundation.

Springboard for the Arts, a nonprofit artist service organization based in St. Paul, has its only satellite office in the River Inn Building, which serves as an artist resource center.

The band Field Report has a song named after Fergus Falls on their eponymous debut album. Lead singer and songwriter, Chris Porterfield, once dated a woman from the town, but the song is actually about a woman he spotted at a downtown Milwaukee music festival. "I saw a girl who was pregnant, and she was with a guy who looked like an asshole," he said. "She looked like she wanted to get out of there. The song was written from her perspective." The song has received critical acclaim.

Media
Television
Public, educational, and government access
Radio
 1020 AM KJJK (AM) (Sports), Leighton Broadcasting
 1250 AM KBRF (Talk), Leighton Broadcasting
 88.7 FM K204FS (Christian), CSN International
 89.7 FM KCMF (Classical), Minnesota Public Radio
 91.5 FM KNWF (News), Minnesota Public Radio
 96.5 FM KJJK-FM (Country),  Leighton Broadcasting
 99.5 FM KPRW (Adult Contemporary),  Result Radio, Inc.
 103.3 FM KZCR (Adult Album Alternative),  Leighton Broadcasting
Newspaper
 The Daily Journal
 The Midweek Inc

Sports
Fergus Falls is the proud home of the Fergus Falls Otters as well as home to M State - Fergus Falls sports and many other local teams and organizations for children, teens, adults and seniors.

Twinning
Fergus falls is twinned with:
 Fife, Scotland, United Kingdom
 Hordaland, Norway

Notable people
 Elmer Ellsworth Adams, Minnesota newspaper editor and politician
 Frank Albertson (1909–1964), actor who appeared in over 100 Hollywood movies including It's a Wonderful Life and Psycho.
 Marcus Borg, theologian; one of the leaders of the Jesus Seminar
 Peter Brandvold, author
 Colvin G. Butler, Minnesota state legislator
 Moses Clapp, Minnesota politician
 Donald Cressey, (1919 – 1987) American penologist, sociologist, and criminologist who made innovative contributions to the study of organized crime, prisons, criminology, the sociology of criminal law, white-collar crime. His work is still used in Fraud investigations today.
 Chad Daniels (b. 1975), comedian, "Comedy Central Presents: Chad Daniels" (2008, 1/2 hour TV special)
 Roger L. Dell, Chief Justice of the Minnesota Supreme Court
 Richard Edlund, multi-Academy Award-winning visual effects artist for his work on Star Wars, The Empire Strikes Back, Raiders of the Lost Ark, and Return of the Jedi
 Clifford L. Hilton, Minnesota Supreme Court justice
 Chuck Knapp, Radio Broadcaster
 Charles Lundy Lewis, Minnesota Supreme Court justice
 Mary MacLane (1881-1929), pioneering feminist author, film-maker, and media personality. Her tomboy youth was spent in Fergus Falls from approximately 1884–1889.  
 Mark W. Olson, former member of Board of Governors of U.S. Federal Reserve
 Cliff Sterrett (1883-1964), innovative and influential artist and cartoonist
 Dave Theurer, creator of Atari's Missile Command, Tempest (video game), and I, Robot (video game)
 Peter Van Santen, Minnesota politician and farmer
 Walter Wellbrock, Minnesota politician and farmer
 Ernest J. Windmiller, Minnesota politician and businessman

City Council
The Fergus Falls City Council holds an Open Forum session from 5:20-5:30 pm in the City Council Chambers. Those wishing to address the City Council regarding an item not on the agenda are asked to completely fill out the Open Forum registration form by noon the day of the City Council meeting. Local city positions besides Mayor are up for election every two years as one Council Member from one of the four wards makes up the city council with the whole council being the Mayor and two council members from each ward.

The list below is the recent history of the Mayor of Fergus Falls, MN.

References

External links

City website
Fergus Falls Chamber of Commerce
Fergus Falls Convention and Visitors Bureau – Visitor Information Site
Otter Tail County Historical Society
Fergus Falls Daily Journal Online

 
Cities in Minnesota
County seats in Minnesota
Cities in Otter Tail County, Minnesota